Nick Harris (November 13, 1998) is an American football center for the Cleveland Browns of the National Football League (NFL). He played college football at Washington and was drafted by the Browns in the fifth round of the 2020 NFL Draft.

College career
Washington was the only school FBS to offer Harris a scholarship, and he committed on July 30, 2015, although Harris did receive offers from FCS teams New Hampshire and Cal Poly. He landed at Washington with JSerra Catholic High School offensive line teammate Luke Wattenberg.

Harris earned a starting spot for part of his true freshman season and held it throughout his career at Washington. He played guard for his first two seasons, but switched to center before his junior season. He missed one game due to injury during his sophomore season and was named honorable mention all-Pac-12 his sophomore year, but was named first-team all-conference his junior and senior years at center.

Before his senior season, Harris was named preseason all-Pac-12 and second-team preseason All-American, and was also named to the preseason watchlists for the Wuerffel Trophy, Outland Trophy, and Rimington Trophy.

After his senior season, Harris played in the 2020 Senior Bowl.

Professional career
Harris was drafted by the Cleveland Browns in the fifth round with the 160th overall pick of the 2020 NFL Draft. Harris signed his rookie contract on May 22, 2020. On January 6, 2021, Harris was placed on injured reserve with a knee injury.

On October 5, 2021, Harris was placed on injured reserve with a hamstring injury. He was activated on November 6.

Harris was placed on injured reserve on August 16, 2022 after sustaining a knee injury during the second play of the Browns' preseason game against the Jacksonville Jaguars.

References

External links
Washington Huskies bio

Living people
1998 births
Players of American football from Inglewood, California
Washington Huskies football players
American football centers
Cleveland Browns players